Birthday Offering is a pièce d'occasion in one scene choreographed by Frederick Ashton to music by Alexander Glazunov, arranged by Robert Irving. The ballet was created in 1956, to celebrate the Royal Ballet's 25th anniversary. The first performance took place on 5 May 1956 at the Royal Opera House, London.

Original cast

 Margot Fonteyn
 Beryl Grey
 Violetta Elvin
 Nadia Nerina
 Rowena Jackson
 Svetlana Beriosova
 Elaine Fifield
 Michael Somes
 Alexander Grant
 Brian Shaw
 Philip Chatfield
 David Blair
 Desmond Doyle
 Bryan Ashbridge

Source:

Order of numbers
In a sumptuous setting, seven couples make a grand entrance, then the women perform a series of seven solo variations. The men dance a bravura mazurka, the principal couple performs an elegant pas de deux, and the ballet ends with a final waltz for the entire ensemble.

 Overture: "L'Eté" from The Seasons, Op. 67
 Valse de concert No. 1, Op. 47
 Pas d'action from Scènes de ballet, Op. 52, and Coda from Ruses d'amour, Op. 61
 1st variation: "Marionettes" from Scènes de ballet
 2nd variation: "La Givre" from The Seasons
 3rd variation: "La Glace" from The Seasons
 4th variation: "La Grêle" from The Seasons
 5th variation: "La Neige" from The Seasons
 6th variation: "L'Eté" from The Seasons
 7th variation: from Ruses d'amour
 Mazurka, Op. 25 No. 3, (orchestrated by Robert Irving)
 Pas de deux; "Grand pas des fiancées" from Ruses d'amour
 Finale: Valse de concert No. 1, reprise

References
Notes

Sources
 Naughtin, Matthew (2014). Ballet Music. Lanham: Rowman & Littlefield. 

Ballets by Frederick Ashton
Ballets to the music of Alexander Glazunov
1956 ballet premieres
Ballets created for The Royal Ballet